Stockholm–DeKalb–Hart Historic District is a national historic district in Ridgewood, Queens, New York.  It includes 79 contributing buildings built between 1900 and 1915.  They consist mainly of brick two-story row houses with one apartment per floor.  Some buildings feature three bay wide wood porches with Tuscan columns.

It was listed on the National Register of Historic Places in 1983.

References

Ridgewood, Queens
Historic districts on the National Register of Historic Places in Queens, New York
Historic districts in Queens, New York